The Torneo Intermedio was a knockout competition played by 16 football teams.

History

1993
The Torneo Intermedio was played during the 1993 Copa América with only Peruvian Primera División teams. The 16 clubs were divided into 4 groups and the top two teams advanced to the quarterfinals. Although Deportivo Municipal won the tournament, they declined to play in the 1994 Copa CONMEBOL and the end-of-season Liguilla runner-up received this berth.

Champions

Titles by club

External links
Soccerway.com
Peruvian Football League News 

Football competitions in Peru
1993 in Peruvian football
Defunct sports competitions in Peru

es:Torneo Intermedio 1993